Eugene Weekly is an alternative weekly newspaper published in Eugene, Oregon.  The paper, published every Thursday, has a circulation of 30,000.  It publishes an annual "Best of Eugene" list, a restaurant guide ("Chow!"), and special sections on festivals, music, wine, health and travel. Eugene Weekly covers local and state politics, news, arts and culture, and it publishes investigative and solutions journalism.

One of the owners of Eugene Weekly was Fred Taylor, the former editor and managing editor of The Wall Street Journal, until his death in 2015. The editor is Camilla Mortensen.

Eugene Weekly has won regional and national awards for its reporting,  solutions journalism  and photography and for its arts criticism.

The newspaper trains up-and-coming journalists through its internship program.

References

External links
 

1982 establishments in Oregon
Alternative weekly newspapers published in the United States
Mass media in Eugene, Oregon
Newspapers published in Oregon
Oregon Newspaper Publishers Association
Publications established in 1982